Nils Andersson may refer to:

 Nils Andersson (footballer) (1887–1947), Swedish footballer
 Nils Andersson (ice hockey) (born 1991), Swedish ice hockey player
 Nils Andersson (painter) (1817–1865), Swedish painter
 Nils Andersson (swimmer) (1889–1973), Swedish swimmer
 Nils Johan Andersson (1821–1880), Swedish botanist and traveller